Saint-Nérée-de-Bellechasse is a municipality of 739 people in the Bellechasse Regional County Municipality, part of the Chaudière-Appalaches administrative region.

Prior to February 18, 2012, it was known simply as Saint-Nérée.

References

Municipalities in Quebec
Incorporated places in Chaudière-Appalaches